Nagueshi or Nagesh is a form of Lord Shiva worshipped by Konkani Hindus in India. The temple lies in verdant surroundings in the Ponda district of Goa. Unlike many other Hindu temples of Goa which were shifted out of the Velha Conquistas the Nagueshi Temple is at its original place. It has, however, been renovated a number of times. It is located in Bandode village, Ponda, North Goa district. The temple has recently banned entry of foreigners into the temple citing objectionable dressing and conduct as the reason.

A 1413 AD stone inscription in the Nagueshi Temple in Ponda speaks of Purush Shennvi's son Maee Shennvi of Kullalogram (cuncolim/Kuncoliem) being granted the village of Bandode (Bandivade) to carry out the rituals of Shri Naguesh and Shree Mahalakshmi temples.

Within the temple precincts is a magnificent tali or water reservoir surrounded by palms. The reservoir is built so that standing at a certain location around the tali, a person can view the reflection of the idol of Lord Naguesh and the lighted lamps in the inner sanctum.

Gallery

See also
 Shenoy
 Goud Saraswat Brahmin

Forms of Shiva